Bárður Oskarsson (born 18 July 1972 in Tórshavn) is a Faroese children's writer, illustrator and artist, who has won several literary awards. His books have been translated into Danish, Norwegian, Icelandic, French, German and Czech.

Biography 
He started to draw when he was a child and got some of his drawings published in the Faroese children's magazine Barnablaðið. The first book he illustrated was his grandfather's (Oskar Hermannsson's) children's book "Undir tussafjøllum". After illustrating other authors' books for some years, he published his own book, where he was both writer and illustrator, in 2004. This was the children's book "Ein hundur ein ketta og ein mús" (A dog, a cat and a mouse), which was later published in French (2006), Icelandic (2007), Danish (2008) and Norwegian (2013). Oskarsson has received Faroese, Nordic and German awards for his children's books. He currently lives in Denmark, where he was trained in the art school "Skolen for Billedkunst" 1992–93.

Bibliography

Children's books, writer and illustrator 
Children's books, which Bárður Oskarsson has both written and illustrated:
 Ein hundur ein ketta og ein mús, Bókadeild Føroya Lærarafelags (BFL), 2004
 Le chien, le chat et la souries. Circonflexe 2006 (Published in France)
 Hundurinn, Kótturin og Músin, Mál og Menning, 2007, (Published in Iceland)
 En hund, en kat og en mus. Torgard, 2008. (Published in Denmark) 
 En Hund en Katt og ei Mus, Orkana, 2013. (Published in Norway)
 Beini, BFL, 2007
 Kødbenet. Torgard, 2008 (Published in Denmark)
 Pól, hin kuli giraffurin, BFL, 2007
 Poul, en cool giraf. Torgard, 2009. (Published in Denmark)
 Flata kaninin, BFL, 2011
 Den flade kanin. Torgard, 2011. (Published in Denmark)
 Das platte Kaninchen, Jacoby & Stuart, 2013 (Published in Germany)
 Den flate Kaninen, Orkana, 2013. (Published in Norway)
A lapos nyuszi, Közép-európai Sarkvidék Egyesület, 2018 (Published in Hungary)
 Stríðið um tað góða grasið, BFL, 2012

Children's books, which Bárður Oskarsson has illustrated 
 Tussarnir á tussatindi, Oskar Hermannsson, Bókadeild Føroya Lærarafelags (BFL), 1993
 Tunnuflakin, Marianna Debes Dahl, Skúlabókagrunnurin. 1990
 Margreta og Mjólkin, Sigga Vang, BFL, 2002
 Um svidnu pussifelluna og øvuta kúvingin, Guðrun Gaard, BFL, 2003
 Tónalæra 1, 2, 3, 4, Skúlabókgrunnurin, 2004
 Um træskoytur og føðingardagsgávuna sum hvarv, Guðrun Gaard, BFL, 2004
 Um gentur og tunnuflakar og ein ommuprikkutan kjóla, Guðrun Gaard, BFL, 2005

Art exhibitions 

Art exhibitions which Bárður Oskarsson participated either by himself and together with others:
 Listasavn Føroya, Tórshavn, FO, 2013
 North Atlantic House, Copenhagen, DK, 2013
 Stefansonshús, FO, 2013
 Gallery Focus, FO, 2012
 My Imaginary Library, Europe, 2007
 Christiania, Copenhagen, DK, 2006
 Leikalund, FO, 2006
 Cafe Jonas, DK, 2005
 North Atlantic House, Copenhagen, DK, 2005
 Smiðjan í Lítluvík, Tórshavn, FO, 2004
 Føroyahúsið (The Faroese House in Copenhagen), DK, 2003
 Smiðjan í Lítluvík, FO, 2002

Awards and nominations 
 2006 - White Raven of The international children`s digital library, Special Mention, for the book Ein hundur, ein ketta og ein mús (English title: A dog, a cat, and a mouse)
 Grunnur Torvald Poulsens, 2005 (scholarship)
 2006 - West Nordic Council's Children and Youth Literature Prize
 2007 - Barnabókaheiðursløn Tórshavnar býráðs
 2013 - White Raven of The international children's digital library for the book Stríðið um tað góða grasið (English title: The quarrel over the good grass)
 2013 - Der LUCHS-Preis für Kinder- und Jugendliteratur nr. 322 for "Das platte kaninchen", November, 2013.
 2014 - Nominated for the Nordic Council Children and Young People's Literature Prize for the book Flata kaninin
 2015 - Received a one-year working grant from Mentanargrunnur Landsins (from the Faroese Ministry of Culture).
 2016 - Nominated for the Nordic Council Children and Young People’s Literature Prize for the book Stríðið um tað góða grasið

References

External links 
Profile at forlagettorgard.dk 

1972 births
Living people
Faroese children's writers
Faroese painters
People from Tórshavn
Faroese Children's Literature Prize recipients